Xcode is Apple's integrated development environment (IDE) for macOS, used to develop software for macOS, iOS, iPadOS, watchOS, and tvOS. It was initially released in late 2003; the latest stable release is version 14.2, released on December 13, 2022, via the Mac App Store with macOS Monterey. The software suite is offered free of charge. Registered developers can download preview releases and prior versions of the suite through the Apple Developer website. Xcode includes command-line tools which enable UNIX-style development via the Terminal app in macOS. They can also be downloaded and installed without the GUI.

Major features 
Xcode supports source code for the programming languages: C, C++, Objective-C, Objective-C++, Java, AppleScript, Python, Ruby, ResEdit (Rez), and Swift, with a variety of programming models, including but not limited to Cocoa, Carbon, and Java. Third parties have added support for GNU Pascal, Free Pascal, Ada, C#, Go, Perl, and D.

Xcode can build fat binary (universal binary) files containing code for multiple architectures with the Mach-O executable format. These helped ease the transitions from 32-bit PowerPC to 64-bit PowerPC, from PowerPC to Intel x86, from 32-bit to 64-bit Intel, and from x86 to Apple silicon by allowing developers to distribute a single application to users and letting the operating system automatically choose the appropriate architecture at runtime. Using the iOS SDK, tvOS SDK, and watchOS SDK, Xcode can also be used to compile and debug applications for iOS, iPadOS, tvOS, and watchOS.

Xcode includes the GUI tool Instruments, which runs atop a dynamic tracing framework, DTrace, created by Sun Microsystems and released as part of OpenSolaris.

Xcode also integrates built-in support for source code management using the Git version control system and protocol, allowing the user to create and clone Git repositories (which can be hosted on source code repository hosting sites such as GitHub, Bitbucket, and Perforce, or self-hosted using open-source software such as GitLab), and to commit, push, and pull changes, all from within Xcode, automating tasks that would traditionally be performed by using Git from the command line.

Composition 
The main application of the suite is the integrated development environment (IDE), also named Xcode. The Xcode suite includes most of Apple's developer documentation, and built-in Interface Builder, an application used to construct graphical user interfaces.
Up to Xcode 4.1, the Xcode suite included a modified version of the GNU Compiler Collection.  In Xcode 3.1 up to Xcode 4.6.3, it included the LLVM-GCC compiler, with front ends from the GNU Compiler Collection and a code generator based on LLVM. In Xcode 3.2 and later, it included the Clang C/C++/Objective-C compiler, with newly-written front ends and a code generator based on LLVM, and the Clang static analyzer.  Starting with Xcode 4.2, the Clang compiler became the default compiler, Starting with Xcode 5.0, Clang was the only compiler provided.

Up to Xcode 4.6.3, the Xcode suite used the GNU Debugger (GDB) as the back-end for the IDE's debugger. Starting with Xcode 4.3, the LLDB debugger was also provided; starting with Xcode 4.5 LLDB replaced GDB as the default back-end for the IDE's debugger. Starting with Xcode 5.0, GDB was no longer supplied.

Playgrounds 
The Playgrounds feature of Xcode provides an environment for rapid experimentation and development in the Swift programming language. The original version of the feature was announced and released by Apple Inc on June 2, 2014, during WWDC 2014.

Playgrounds provide a testing ground that renders developer code in real time. They have the capability of evaluating and displaying the results of single expressions as they are coded (in line or on a side bar), providing rapid feedback to the programmer. This type of development environment, known as a read-eval-print loop (or REPL) is useful for learning, experimenting and fast prototyping. Playgrounds was used by Apple to publish Swift tutorials and guided tours where the REPL advantages are noticeable.

The Playgrounds feature was developed by the Developer Tools department at Apple. According to Chris Lattner, the inventor of Swift Programming Language and Senior Director and Architect at the Developer Tools Department, Playgrounds was "heavily influenced by Bret Victor's ideas, by Light Table and by many other interactive systems". Playgrounds was announced by Apple Inc. on June 2, 2014, during WWDC 2014 as part of Xcode 6 and released in September.

In September 2016, the Swift Playgrounds application for iPad (also available on macOS starting in February 2020) was released, incorporating these ideas into an educational tool. Xcode's Playgrounds feature continued development, with a new step-by-step execution feature introduced in Xcode 10 at WWDC 2018.

Removed features 
Formerly, Xcode supported distributing a product build process over multiple systems. One technology involved was named Shared Workgroup Build, which used the Bonjour protocol to automatically discover systems providing compiler services, and a modified version of the free software product distcc to facilitate the distribution of workloads. Earlier versions of Xcode provided a system named Dedicated Network Builds. These features are absent in the supported versions of Xcode.

Xcode also includes Apple's WebObjects tools and frameworks for building Java web applications and web services (formerly sold as a separate product). As of Xcode 3.0, Apple dropped WebObjects development inside Xcode; WOLips should be used instead. Xcode 3 still includes the WebObjects frameworks.

Version history

1.x series 
Xcode 1.0 was released in fall 2003. Xcode 1.0 was based on Project Builder, but had an updated user interface (UI), ZeroLink, Fix & Continue, distributed build support, and Code Sense indexing.

The next significant release, Xcode 1.5, had better code completion and an improved debugger.

2.x series 
Xcode 2.0 was released with Mac OS X v10.4 "Tiger". It included the Quartz Composer visual programming language, better Code Sense indexing for Java, and Ant support. It also included the Apple Reference Library tool, which allows searching and reading online documentation from Apple's website and documentation installed on a local computer.

Xcode 2.1 could create universal binary files. It supported shared precompiled headers, unit testing targets, conditional breakpoints, and watchpoints. It also had better dependency analysis.

The final version of Xcode for Mac OS X v10.4 was 2.5.

3.x series 
Xcode 3.0 was released with Mac OS X v10.5 "Leopard". Notable changes since 2.1 include the DTrace debugging tool (now named Instruments), refactoring support, context-sensitive documentation, and Objective-C 2.0 with garbage collection.  It also supports Project Snapshots, which provide a basic form of version control; Message Bubbles, which show build errors debug values alongside code; and building four-architecture fat binaries (32 and 64-bit Intel and PowerPC).

Xcode 3.1 was an update release of the developer tools for Mac OS X, and was the same version included with the iPhone SDK. It could target non-Mac OS X platforms, including iPhone OS 2.0. It included the GCC 4.2 and LLVM GCC 4.2 compilers. Another new feature since Xcode 3.0 is that Xcode's SCM support now includes Subversion 1.5.

Xcode 3.2 was released with Mac OS X v10.6 "Snow Leopard" and installs on no earlier version of OS X.  It supports static program analysis, among other features. It also drops official support for targeting versions earlier than iPhone OS 3.0. But it is still possible to target older versions, and the simulator supports iPhone OS 2.0 through 3.1. Also, Java support is "exiled" in 3.2 to the organizer.

Xcode 3.2.6 is the last version that can be downloaded for free for users of Mac OS X Snow Leopard (though it’s not the last version that supports Snow Leopard; 4.2 is). Downloading Xcode 3.2.6 requires a free registration at Apple's developer site.

4.x series 
In June 2010, at the Apple Worldwide Developers Conference version 4 of Xcode was announced during the Developer Tools State of the Union address. Version 4 of the developer tools consolidates the Xcode editing tools and Interface Builder into one application, among other enhancements. Apple released the final version of Xcode 4.0 on March 9, 2011. The software was made available for free to all registered members of the $99 per year Mac Developer program and the $99 per year iOS Developer program. It was also sold for $4.99 to non-members on the Mac App Store (no longer available).  Xcode 4.0 drops support for many older systems, including all PowerPC development and software development kits (SDKs) for Mac OS X 10.4 and 10.5, and all iOS SDKs older than 4.3.  The deployment target can still be set to produce binaries for those older platforms, but for Mac OS platforms, one is then limited to creating x86 and x86-64 binaries. Later, Xcode was free to the general public. Before version 4.1, Xcode cost $4.99.

Xcode 4.1 was made available for free on July 20, 2011 (the day of Mac OS X Lion's release) to all users of Mac OS X Lion on the Mac App Store. On August 29, 2011, Xcode 4.1 was made available for Mac OS X Snow Leopard for members of the paid Mac or iOS developer programs. Xcode 4.1 was the last version to include GNU Compiler Collection (GCC) instead of only LLVM GCC or Clang.

On October 12, 2011, Xcode 4.2 was released concurrently with the release of iOS 5.0, and it included many more and improved features, such as storyboarding and automatic reference counting (ARC). Xcode 4.2 is the last version to support Mac OS X 10.6 "Snow Leopard", but is available only to registered developers with paid accounts; without a paid account, 3.2.6 is the latest download that appears for Snow Leopard.

Xcode 4.3, released on February 16, 2012, is distributed as one application bundle, Xcode.app, installed from the Mac App Store. Xcode 4.3 reorganizes the Xcode menu to include development tools. Xcode 4.3.1 was released on March 7, 2012 to add support for iOS 5.1. Xcode 4.3.2 was released on March 22, 2012 with enhancements to the iOS Simulator and a suggested move to the LLDB debugger versus the GDB debugger (which appear to be undocumented changes). Xcode 4.3.3, released in May 2012, featured an updated SDK for Mac OS X 10.7.4 "Lion" and a few bug fixes.

Xcode 4.4 was released on July 25, 2012.
It runs on both Mac OS X Lion (10.7) and OS X Mountain Lion (10.8) and is the first version of Xcode to contain the OS X 10.8 "Mountain Lion" SDK. Xcode 4.4 includes support for automatic synthesizing of declared properties, new Objective-C features such as literal syntax and subscripting, improved localization, and more. On August 7, 2012, Xcode 4.4.1 was released with a few bug fixes.

On September 19, 2012, iOS 6 and Xcode 4.5 were released. Xcode added support for iOS 6 and the 4-inch Retina Display on iPhone 5 and iPod Touch 5th generation. It also brought some new Objective-C features to iOS, simplified localization, and added auto-layout support for iOS. On October 3, 2012, Xcode 4.5.1 was released with bug fixes and stability improvements. Less than a month later, Xcode 4.5.2 was released, with support for iPad Mini and iPad with Retina Display, and bug fixes and stability improvements.

On January 28, 2013, iOS 6.1 and Xcode 4.6 were released.

5.x series 
On June 10, 2013, at the Apple Worldwide Developers Conference, version 5 of Xcode was announced.
On September 18, 2013, Xcode 5.0 was released. It shipped with iOS 7 and OS X 10.8 Mountain Lion SDKs. However, support for OS X 10.9 Mavericks was only available in beta versions. Xcode 5.0 also added a version of Clang generating 64-bit ARM code for iOS 7. Apple removed support for building garbage collected Cocoa binaries in Xcode 5.1.

6.x series
On June 2, 2014, at the Worldwide Developers Conference, Apple announced version 6 of Xcode. One of the most notable features was support for Swift, an all-new programming language developed by Apple. Xcode 6 also included features like Playgrounds and live debugging tools. On September 17, 2014, at the same time, iOS 8 and Xcode 6 were released. Xcode could be downloaded on the Mac App Store.

7.x series 
On June 8, 2015, at the Apple Worldwide Developers Conference, Xcode version 7 was announced. It introduced support for Swift 2, and Metal for OS X, and added support for deploying on iOS devices without an Apple Developer account. Xcode 7 was released on September 16, 2015.

8.x series 
On June 13, 2016, at the Apple Worldwide Developers Conference, Xcode version 8 was announced; a beta version was released the same day. It introduced support for Swift 3. Xcode 8 was released on September 13, 2016.

9.x series 
On June 5, 2017, at the Apple Worldwide Developers Conference, Xcode version 9 was announced; a beta version was released the same day. It introduced support for Swift 4 and Metal 2. It also introduced remote debugging on iOS and tvOS devices wirelessly, through Wi-Fi.

Xcode 9 was publicly released on September 19, 2017.

10.x series 
On June 4, 2018, at the Apple Worldwide Developers Conference, Xcode version 10 was announced; a beta version was released the same day. Xcode 10 introduced support for the Dark Mode announced for macOS Mojave, the collaboration platforms Bitbucket and GitLab (in addition to already supported GitHub), training machine learning models from playgrounds, and the new features in Swift 4.2 and Metal 2.1, as well as improvements to the editor and the project build system. Xcode 10 also dropped support for building 32-bit macOS apps and no longer supports Subversion integration.

Xcode 10 was publicly released on September 17, 2018.

11.x series 
On June 3, 2019, at the Apple Worldwide Developers Conference, Xcode version 11 was announced; a beta version was released the same day. Xcode 11 introduced support for the new features in Swift 5.1, as well as the new SwiftUI framework (although the interactive UI tools are available only when running under macOS 10.15). It also supports building iPad applications that run under macOS; includes integrated support for the Swift Package Manager; and contains further improvements to the editor, including a "minimap" that gives an overview of a source code file with quick navigation. Xcode 11 requires macOS 10.14 or later and Xcode 11.4 requires 10.15 or later. 

Xcode 11 was publicly released on September 20, 2019.

12.x series 
On June 22, 2020, at the Apple Worldwide Developers Conference, Xcode version 12 was announced; a beta version was released the same day. Xcode 12 introduced support for Swift 5.3 and requires macOS 10.15.4 or later.

Xcode 12 was publicly released on September 16, 2020.

13.x series 
On June 7, 2021, at the Apple Worldwide Developers Conference, Xcode version 13 was announced; a beta version was released the same day.

The new version introduced support for Swift 5.5 and requires macOS 11.3 or later. Xcode 13 contains SDKs for iOS / iPadOS 15, macOS 12, watchOS 8, and tvOS 15. Xcode 13’s major features include the new concurrency model in Swift projects, improved support for version control providers (such as GitHub), including the ability to browse, view, and comment on pull requests right in the app interface, and support for Xcode Cloud, Apple’s newly-launched CI/CD service (it also has a web version).

Xcode 13 was publicly released on September 20, 2021.

14.x series 
On June 6, 2022, at the Apple Worldwide Developers Conference, Xcode version 14 was announced; a beta version was released the same day.

Xcode 14 was publicly released on September 12, 2022.

Version comparison table

Xcode 1.0 - Xcode 2.x (before iOS support)

Xcode 3.0 - Xcode 4.x

Xcode 5.0 - 6.x (since arm64 support)

Xcode 7.0 - 10.x (since Free On-Device Development)

Xcode 11.0 - 14.x (since SwiftUI framework)

Toolchain versions

Xcode 1.0 - Xcode 2.x (before iOS support)

Xcode 3.0 - Xcode 4.x

Xcode 5.0 - 6.x (since arm64 support)

Xcode 7.0  - 10.x (since Free On-Device Development)

Xcode 11.0 - 14.x (since SwiftUI framework)

See also 
 XcodeGhost

References

External links 
 Xcode – Mac App Store
 Apple Developer Connection: Xcode tools and resources
 Xcode Release Notes — Archive
 Download Xcode

2003 software
Freeware
History of software
Integrated development environments
IOS
IOS development software
MacOS programming tools
MacOS text editors
MacOS-only software made by Apple Inc.
Software version histories
User interface builders